

League table

Statistics

Appearances and goals 

|-
|colspan="14"|Players who left Exeter before the end of the season:

|-
|colspan="14"|Players who played on loan for Exeter and returned to their parent club:

|}

Top scorers

Disciplinary record

Results

Pre-season friendlies

League One

FA Cup

League Cup

FL Trophy

Transfers

Awards

References 

2011–12
2011–12 Football League One by team